Attack on a China Mission is a 1900 British short  silent drama film, directed by James Williamson, showing some sailors coming to the rescue of the wife of a missionary killed by Boxers. The four-shot film, according to Michael Brooke of BFI Screenonline, was innovative in content and technique. It incorporated a reverse-angle cut and at least two dozen performers, whereas most dramatic films of the era consisted of single-figure casts and very few shots. Film historian John Barnes claims Attack on a China Mission had "the most fully developed narrative" of any English film up to that time."

Production 
The director, inspired by Georges Méliès' influential eleven-scene dramatised documentary L'Affaire Dreyfus (1899), made the film to meet a perceived public demand for footage of the Boxer Rebellion, which began in the early months of 1900, at a derelict house called Ivy Lodge in Hove, where, according to Michael Brooke, "he went to considerable lengths to ensure that his film appeared to be authentic, kitting out the house with a bilingual Anglo-Chinese 'Mission Station' sign and drawing on his background as a chemist in order to fake gunshots and explosions."

Premiere 

Preservation 
Just under half of  the original 230 feet of footage survives, but, according to Michael Brooke, "it includes material from all four shots, and, despite some obvious trims (the initial forcing of the gate is missing, and the wife's appeal on the balcony to the sailors must surely have lasted more than one second), enough remains to give a good account of what the original audience must have seen."

References

External links

 

1900 films
British black-and-white films
British silent short films
Films directed by James Williamson (film pioneer)
Films set in China
Boxer Rebellion
British drama short films
1900 drama films
Silent drama films